Are Years What? (for Marianne Moore) is a sculpture by American artist Mark di Suvero. It is in the collection of the Hirshhorn Museum and Sculpture Garden, in Washington, D.C., United States. The sculpture is named after poet Marianne Moore's "What Are Years". From May 22, 2013 through May 26, 2014, the sculpture resided temporarily in San Francisco, as part of the San Francisco Museum of Modern Art's Mark di Suvero exhibition at Crissy Field.

Description 
This 10-ton sculpture is made of nine red-orange steel I-beams, welded together, with one section suspended as a giant mobile with wire, shaped like a "V".

Information 
Are Years What? (for Marianne Moore) is signature of di Suvero's monumental early 1960s "open-work constructions." These works utilize cast-off construction materials like chains, metal bars, and ladders. This sculpture is the first that di Suvero built, from beginning to end, with I-beams and using a crane, solely by himself.

Acquisition and installation 
Are Years What? was originally in the collection of the artist, then the collection of Enrico Martignoni of Winnemucca, Nevada. Hirshhorn director James Demetrion first saw the sculpture when it was on display in Brooklyn's Prospect Park. The sculpture was acquired by the Hirshhorn with funds from the Joseph H. Hirshhorn Purchase Fund, a gift from the Institute of Scrap Recycling Industries, and by exchange of the di Suvero artwork ISIS, in 1999. The sculpture was installed on June 13, 1999, by crane into the museum's sculpture garden.

Reception 
The dangling "V" shaped piece of the sculpture has been described as representing the prow of a ship, or, as by art critic Irving Sandler as a representation of di Suvero's family's maritime heritage in Venice. Sandler also stated that the acute angles have male and female associations, with the horizontal representing a penis and the vertical "V", a vagina, which di Suvero does not associate with the work. The "V" has also been suggested to represent birds in flight or a "V" for victory. Jayne Merkel believed that Are Years What? exploited the strengths of the I-beams yet "at the same time, he has made a piece that is graceful and well balanced - aesthetically pleasing and intriguing from a number of points of view." Upon the sculpture's installation at the Hirshhorn, The Washington Post received the work as "brilliant in conception," "prominent, beautiful and memorable. It lifts the heart and stays in the mind. It is a gift to the city and all who visit." Are Years What? is considered by some to be di Suvero's "breakthrough work."

Exhibition history 
Solo show, 1997, Jeanne-Bucher Gallery, Paris
Solo show, 1995–1996, Storm King Art Center, Mountainville, New York
Solo show, 1995, Venice Biennale, Venice, Italy
Solo show, 1994–1995, Valencia Museum of Modern Art, Valencia, Spain
Mark di Suvero Retrospect, 1991, Museum of Modern Art, Nice
1988, Wurttembergischer Kunstverein, Stuttgart, Germany
Prospect Park, 1975–1976, Whitney Museum of American Art, New York, New York
Sculpture off the Pedestal, 1970s, Grand Rapids, Michigan
Plus by Minus, 1968, Albright-Knox Gallery, Buffalo, New York

Gallery

See also 
 List of public art in Washington, D.C., Ward 2

References

Further reading 
Kardon, J. "1967 at the Crossroads", Institute of Contemporary Art, University of Pennsylvania Press, 1987. Exhibition catalog.
Lyons, J. Washington, D.C.: A Pictorial Celebration. Sterling Publishing, 2005.  Features Are Years What? in pictorial
Richard, P. (29 August 1999). "Here & Now". The Washington Post.

External links 
 
Are Years What? (For Marianne Moore) from di Suvero's website, on display in Venice.
"What Are Years" poem by Marianne Moore

Works by Mark di Suvero
1967 sculptures
Hirshhorn Museum and Sculpture Garden
Sculptures of the Smithsonian Institution
Abstract sculptures in Washington, D.C.
Modernist sculpture
Outdoor sculptures in Washington, D.C.
Steel sculptures in Washington, D.C.